Odorheiu Secuiesc is the second largest municipality in Harghita County, Transylvania, Romania. In its short form, it is also known as Odorhei in Romanian and Udvarhely in Hungarian. The Hungarian name of the town "Udvarhely" means "courtyard place".

Demographics 
The city has a population of 34,257. Among those for whom data are available, 95.8% are ethnic Hungarians, making it the urban settlement with the third-highest proportion of Hungarians in Romania. The city is also home to communities of ethnic Romanians (2.6%) and Roma (1.5%).

Half the population of the town professes Roman Catholicism (50.05%), while the remaining half is primarily divided between Hungarian Reformed (30.14%), Unitarian (14.71%), and Romanian Orthodox (2.54%) communities.

History
A Roman fortress was found under the ruins of a medieval fort in the centre of the town. A funeral inscription was also found placed by the veteran, Aelius Equester, former centurion, to his wife Aurelia Juiuni and himself. The inscription dates back to the 7th century AD. Stamps with the letters of the Alpinorum equitata cohort and the Ubiorum cohort were also found in Odorhei. The town, as the former seat of the Udvarhely comitatus, is one of the historical centers of Székely Land. The first known reference to the city was in a papal register of duties in 1334 when it was mentioned by its Hungarian name, a sacerdos de Oduorhel. Since 1615, when Gabriel Bethlen, Prince of Transylvania, reaffirmed the rights of the town, the place has been referred to as Székelyudvarhely.

Udvarhely was the location of the first assembly of Székelys in 1357. A fortress was built in the town in 1451. It was rebuilt and strengthened by John II Sigismund Zápolya in 1565, in order to control the Székelys. Wallachian Prince Michael the Brave allied with the Szekelys and Habsburgs  destroyed the fortress in 1599 during his campaign in Transylvania. It was repeatedly rebuilt and destroyed again during history. The ruins of the structure are nowadays known as "The Székely-Attacked Fortress".

The town was historically part of the Szeklerland region of Transylvania. It was the seat of Udvarhelyszék District until the administrative reform of Transylvania in 1876, when it fell within the Udvarhely County in the Kingdom of Hungary. In the aftermath of World War I, the Union of Transylvania with Romania was declared in December 1918. At the start of the Hungarian–Romanian War of 1918–1919, the town passed under Romanian administration. After the Treaty of Trianon of 1920, it became part of the Kingdom of Romania and fell within Odorhei County during the interwar period. In 1940, the Second Vienna Award granted Northern Transylvania to Hungary. Towards the end of World War II, Romanian and Soviet armies entered the town in October 1944. The territory of Northern Transylvania remained under Soviet military administration until March 9, 1945, after which it became again part of Romania. Between 1952 and 1960, the town fell within the Magyar Autonomous Region, between 1960 and 1968 the Mureș-Magyar Autonomous Region. After the administrative reform of 1968, the region was abolished, and since then, the town has been part of Harghita County.

The town and the surrounding villages were hit by a significant flood in August 2005.

A statue park of historical persons of importance for the Székelys was unveiled in the town on 22 May 2004. This gave rise to controversy, as one of the statues (The Wandering Szekler) was interpreted in the Romanian press as being the portrait of controversial writer and poet Albert Wass.

Education
The town is renowned in the region for its long and distinguished tradition in secondary education. Its oldest and foremost secondary school is  Liceul Teoretic Tamasi Aron Gimnazium (founded by Jesuits in 1593). The lyceum/gimnazium is one of the oldest Hungarian institutions of learning; its current building is an architectural masterpiece of Art Nouveau. Other notable secondary schools include: Backamadarasi Kis Gergely Reformed College (founded in 1670 as one of the most important places of learning by the Hungarian Reformed Church in Transylvania); Benedek Elek Teachers' College (its main building is a monument); Pallo Imre Art and Music School; Eotvos Jozsef Agricultural Technological School.

Odorheiu Secuiesc currently has one institution of higher education College of Modern Business Studies, an affiliate of Edutus College in Tatabanya  (Hungary), with degrees in tourism and hospitality management, business administration, marketing and communication, development and economics, agricultural technology, forestry management and e-business. Dual degrees are also offered with Budapest Business School, University of Pannonia in Keszthely, Óbuda University in Budapest, and Széchenyi István University in Győr (Hungary).

Politics 

The mayor of Odorheiu Secuiesc is Árpád Gálfi, re-elected in 2020. At the 2020 elections he represented the Partidul Oamenilor Liberi (Hungarian: Szabad Emberek Pártja, "Party of the Free People"), but he was deprived of membership in that party in April 2021.

The City Council has 19 members:

Tourism 

Odorheiu Secuiesc is a small yet culturally vibrant town. It has a sizeable theater, the Haáz Rezső Museum (featuring permanent and seasonal exhibits dedicated to Szekler village life, Szekler arts and crafts, the history of the region, and a growing collection of Hungarian painters in Transylvania), a philharmonic orchestra of Szeklerland, a local TV studio, and several local newspapers. Throughout the year, there are festivals and youth events (http://tourinfo.ro/), a monthly farmer's market selling local, traditional and organic products. With strong cultural ties to Hungary, the town frequently hosts artists, writers and bands from Hungary. The town also features a central park, a large open air pool and several spas. Its main square, flanked by historic public buildings, is Márton Áron Square, or as the locals call it, Horseshoe Square (due to its shape).

Odorheiu Secuiesc and the area have some great touristic attractions, such as a bike path to Szejke Spa (also the burial ground of the Szekler ethnographer Balázs Orbán) and the Mineral Water Trails Museum, the low-Alpine-type ski resort of Madaras Harghita Mountains (part of the eastern range of the Carpathians) as well as charming mountain bungalows and farm guest houses (http://transylvaniantravel.ro/en) on the mountainous paths and Alpine slopes leading to the Madaras Peak (with genuine farm-to-table dining experiences), in addition to several mineral water springs and pools (Homorod Spa, Lake of Zetelaka), with great fishing and hunting. The salty Bear Lake in Sovata, a significant resort town that has been recently redeveloped, is also less than one hour's drive away (46 km).

The region has seen increased interest in eco-tourism, wildlife hiking and bear-watching, biking, rock climbing, horse riding, photo-tourism and cultural tourism. Odorheiu Secuiesc has three large hotels: Hotel Tarnava, Hotel Gondűző, and Septimia Wellness Hotel and Spa. Other accommodation options are smaller B&Bs (panzio) and guest houses: Crown (Korona) Inn, Maestro B&B, and Carriage B&B (Hinto Panzio), Villa Vitae.

The town is an ideal day-trip destination for tourists exploring the richness and diversity of Transylvania due to its closeness to the Medieval (formerly) Saxon towns of Sighișoara (50 km), Brașov (109 km), Sibiu (150 km), as well as the world-famous Bran Castle, better known as Dracula Castle, (130 km), yet it offers a different cultural experience thanks to its carefully preserved Hungarian culture. The surrounding villages showcase traditional Szekler-Hungarian house-building techniques and woodcraft, such as the stooped Szekler Gates. The rich and distinctive furniture-carving and painting techniques of villages in Szeklerland were showcased in the Smithsonian Folklife Festival's Hungarian Heritage program in June 2013 in Washington, D.C., USA.

The closest airport is  Targu Mures International Airport (110 km) with direct flights (Rynair, Wizzair or Tarom) to Budapest, London, Barcelona, Bergamo, Bologna, Madrid, Rome, Bucharest, Brussels, and Pisa.

Natives
 György Csanády (1895–1942), author of the Székely Anthem
 András Csiky (b. 1930), actor
 Peter Eötvös (b. 1944), Hungarian composer and conductor; principal guest conductor with the BBC Symphony Orchestra in the 1980s; currently principal guest conductor of the Gothenburg Symphony Orchestra
 Zoltan Fejer-Konnerth (b. 1978), Hungarian-German table tennis player
 Márta Károlyi (b. 1942), women's gymnastics coach, currently of U.S. National Women's Team, formerly of Romanian Olympic champion Nadia Comăneci, among many others
 István Lakatos (born around 1620), historian
 Csaba László (b. 1964), footballer and football manager
 Anton Lipošćak (1863–1924), Austro-Hungarian World War I general of the infantry and a Governor-General of the Military Government of Lublin
 Gerő Mály (1884–1952), actor
  (1916–2007), Hungarian writer, winner of the Kossuth Prize
 Magdalena Mikloș (b. 1948), handball player
 László Rajk (1909–1949), Hungarian Communist politician, Minister of the Interior then of Foreign Affairs of Communist Hungary, victim of Mátyás Rákosi's show trials
 Rezső Soó (1903–1980), Hungarian botanist and professor at University of Budapest, winner of the Kossuth Prize
 Mózes Székely (1553–1603), prince of Transylvania
 Sándor Tomcsa (1897–1963), writer, playwright, journalist, caricaturist

International relations

Twin towns — Sister cities
Odorheiu Secuiesc is twinned with:

References

External links

 Official website of the town 
 udvarhely.eu 
 Full Gospel Church 
 Sándor Tomcsa Theater 

Populated places in Harghita County
Localities in Transylvania
Cities in Romania
Székely communities
Place names of Hungarian origin in Romania
Capitals of former Romanian counties